is a former Japanese football player.

Playing career
Satoru Makino played for Zweigen Kanazawa, FC Ryukyu from 2013 to 2014.

References

External links

1990 births
Living people
Shobi University alumni
Association football people from Tokyo
Japanese footballers
J3 League players
Japan Football League players
Zweigen Kanazawa players
FC Ryukyu players
Association football forwards